Geoff Byrd (born in Portland, Oregon on August 27, 1970) is an American musician.

Geoff Byrd is a singer, songwriter, producer and author. Byrd has written songs with John Oates, Jed Leiber, Kansas, Billy Morrison, Samantha Landrum, and many others. He's had over 1,000 placements of his original songs on film and TV. He also toured with Hall and Oates as the opening act for 50 shows in the U.S.and Canada. Was the opening act for Stevie Wonder. Shared the stage with Billy Gibbons, T Bone Wolk and many others. He is also a film maker and editor, making music videos, doc shorts and full length documentary films.

Discography 

Vulnerable (2000)

Candy Shell (2003)

Shrinking Violets (2005)

Featurette (2007)

X-Ray Vision (2009)

Lux (2010)

Deep Black (2018)

Best Of Geoff Byrd (2018)

References

External links 
 
 November 2005 interview on Sidewalks Entertainment

Musicians from Portland, Oregon
Living people
1970 births
Singers from Oregon
21st-century American male singers
21st-century American singers